Shadyside Presbyterian Church is a large congregation of the Presbyterian Church (U.S.A.) in an historic part of Pittsburgh, Pennsylvania, United States.  Located at the corner of Amberson Avenue and Westminster Place in the Shadyside neighborhood, Shadyside Presbyterian Church was founded in 1866 as a congregation in the Presbyterian Church in the U.S.A. and has enjoyed a long history of local, national, and global recognition for its outreach and service.

The Shadyside church building is listed on the National Register of Historic Places as a prime example of Richardsonian Romanesque architecture.  It was completed in 1890 to designs of American architectural firm Shepley, Rutan & Coolidge, the successor firm to H.H. Richardson's own office.

Throughout its long history, the church has been served by a succession of notable preachers, including Hugh Thomson Kerr Sr., Robert Cleveland Holland, Howard C. Scharfe, and F. Morgan Roberts. Between 2003 and 2012, the congregation had as its senior pastor M. Craig Barnes, noted author and speaker, and professor at Pittsburgh Theological Seminary, until his election as president of Princeton Theological Seminary. Conrad C. Sharps served as senior pastor 2014–2018. The Rev. Dr. John Allan Dalles, a well-known hymn writer, Pittsburgh native, and graduate of Pittsburgh Theological Seminary, was the church's Interim Senior Minister and Head of Staff, 2019–2021. The current pastor, the twelfth in the church's history, is the Reverend Austin Crenshaw Shelley.

It was here, in 1933 that the now global practice of celebrating World Communion Sunday on the first Sunday in October was originated, under the leadership of The Rev. Dr. Hugh Thomson Kerr.  It also was the first church anywhere to pioneer regular radio broadcasts of its worship, on KDKA, the first commercially licensed radio station in the United States, and was the first church to broadcast worship to both the North Pole and to the South Pole.

References

External links

Church website

Presbyterian churches in Pennsylvania
Pittsburgh History & Landmarks Foundation Historic Landmarks
Churches in Pittsburgh
Churches on the National Register of Historic Places in Pennsylvania
Churches completed in 1889
19th-century Presbyterian church buildings in the United States
Romanesque Revival church buildings in Pennsylvania
Richardsonian Romanesque architecture in Pennsylvania
Historic American Buildings Survey in Pennsylvania
National Register of Historic Places in Pittsburgh
Presbyterian Church (USA) churches